Meliscaeva cinctella is a Holarctic species of hoverfly.

Description
Wing length 7-9.75 mm. 
External images
For terms see Morphology of Diptera
Winglength 7-9-75 mm. Elongated body. Lunula black with a black mark above it. Face entirely yellow. The alula is a narrow, rectangule. Tergite 2 with broad, square yellow marks. Tergites 3 and 4 with broad yellow bands which extend to the abdominal margin and have little points (one pointing forwards and the other backwards).
See references for determination. 
. The male genitalia are figured by Hippa (1968). Larva described and figured by Rotheray (1994).

Distribution
Palearctic Fennoscandia South to Iberia the Mediterranean basin. Ireland East through most of Europe, Turkey and European Russian then East to Siberia and the Russian Far East to the Pacific coast (Kuril Isles) Nearctic Alaska south to California and Colorado.

Biology
The species' habitat includes deciduous and coniferous forest, hedgerows and suburban gardens and parks. Flowers visited include white umbellifers, Acer pseudoplatanus, Crataegus, Euphorbia, Ilex, Ligustrum, Lonicera periclymenum, Origanum vulgare, Polygonum cuspidatum, Potentilla erecta, Prunus spinosa, Ranunculus, Rhododendron, Rubus fruticosus, Rubus idaeus, Salix, Sambucus, Senecio jacobaea, Solidago virgaurea, Sorbus aucuparia and Taraxacum
.
The flight period is April to September. The larva feeds on aphids on bushes, shrub and trees.

References

Diptera of Europe
Diptera of North America
Syrphinae
Syrphini
Insects described in 1843
Taxa named by Johan Wilhelm Zetterstedt